Armistead Maupin's Tales of the City is an American drama streaming television miniseries that premiered June 7, 2019, on Netflix, based on the Tales of the City novels by Armistead Maupin. Laura Linney, Paul Gross, Olympia Dukakis, and Barbara Garrick reprise their roles from previous television adaptations of Maupin's books: the original Tales of the City in 1993, and the sequels More Tales of the City (1998) and Further Tales of the City (2001). The series was Dukakis's final television role before her death.

The show won the GLAAD Media Award for Outstanding Limited Series at the 31st GLAAD Media Awards, the third time the series has won the award following the original Tales of the City at the 1995 awards ceremony and sequel More Tales of the City at the  1999 ceremony.

Premise
Mary Ann Singleton returns to 28 Barbary Lane in San Francisco after a 23-year absence for the 90th birthday of her former landlady, Anna Madrigal. Mary Ann is happily reunited with Michael Tolliver and Anna, but things are more complicated with her ex-husband, Brian Hawkins, and Shawna, the daughter she left behind to pursue a broadcasting career. Shawna follows a mysterious attraction to a new girl in town who is making a documentary about 28 Barbary Lane. The relationship between transgender man Jake Rodriguez and his lesbian girlfriend Margot Park faces challenges as Jake explores his newfound attraction to men. Michael struggles with the option to stop using condoms now that he is in a relationship with Ben Marshall, who is on PrEP. Anna begins receiving mysterious letters threatening to expose a secret from her past.

Cast and characters

Main

Laura Linney as Mary Ann Singleton, Shawna's estranged adoptive mother who returns to San Francisco after leaving over 20 years prior
Elliot Page as Shawna Hawkins, Mary Ann and Brian's adopted daughter
Paul Gross as Brian Hawkins, Mary Ann's ex-husband and Shawna's adoptive father
Murray Bartlett as Michael "Mouse" Tolliver, Mary Ann's best friend from 28 Barbary Lane
Charlie Barnett as Ben Marshall, Michael's younger boyfriend
Garcia as Jake Rodriguez, a transgender man who is Anna's caregiver at 28 Barbary Lane
May Hong as Margot Park, Jake's girlfriend
Olympia Dukakis as Anna Madrigal, a 90-year-old transgender woman and the owner of 28 Barbary Lane
Barbara Garrick as DeDe Halcyon Day, a socialite, Mary Ann's friend, and Margot's love interest

Recurring
Ashley Park as Jennifer / Ani, an Instagram influencer alongside her twin brother, Raven
Christopher Larkin as Jonathan / Raven, Ani's twin brother
Zosia Mamet as Claire Duncan, a documentarian and Shawna's love interest
Michael Park as Robert Watson, Mary Ann's husband who is divorcing her
Caldwell Tidicue as Ida Best, manager of the Body Politic burlesque bar
Dickie Hearts as Mateo, DeDe's deaf butler
Michelle Buteau as Wren, Brian's neighbor and friend
Victor Garber as Sam Garland, a man from Rainbow Readers who reads books to Anna
Benjamin Thys as Eli, a man who begins a polyamorous sexual relationship with Shawna and his wife
Samantha Soule as Inka, Eli's polyamorous wife
Juan Castano as Flaco Ramirez, Ben's co-worker and Jake's love interest
Matthew Risch as Harrison, Michael's ex-boyfriend
Jen Richards as young Anna Madrigal
Daniela Vega as Ysela, a transgender woman and Anna's first friend when she moved to San Francisco

Guest
Malcolm Gets as Stan, a friend of Harrison
Dan Butler as Dan, a friend of Harrison. Butler previously portrayed the character Edward Bass Matheson in More Tales of the City.
Stephen Spinella as Chris, a friend of Harrison
Bryan Batt as Chris Bauer, a friend of Harrison
John Glover as Bill Schwartz, a retired SFPD officer and resident of the Flamingo Arms
Luke Kirby as Tommy, an SFPD officer who is Young Anna's boyfriend
Molly Ringwald as Mrs. Duncan, Claire's mother and an art collector
Katya Zamolodchikova as wedding officiant
Mary Louise Wilson as Doris, a resident of a retirement community that Anna visits

Episodes

Production

Development
Netflix announced June 28, 2017, the development of a revival of the Tales of the City television miniseries, based on the novels by Armistead Maupin. A subsequent April 23, 2018, announcement included a production order for ten episodes, with the series to be written by Lauren Morelli, who would serve as showrunner and executive producer, alongside an all-LGBTQ writer's room. Other executive producers would include Maupin, Alan Poul, Laura Linney, Andrew Stearn, Liza Chasin, Tim Bevan, and Eric Fellner. Michael Cunningham would serve as consulting producer and Poul was also expected to direct. Production companies involved with the series include Working Title Television and NBCUniversal International. An announcement on April 9, 2019, revealed the series would be released on June 7, 2019.

Casting
Alongside the initial series development announcement, it was reported that Laura Linney and Olympia Dukakis would reprise their roles as Mary Ann Singleton and Anna Madrigal, respectively. Concurrent with the news of the series order, it was confirmed that Linney, Dukakis, and Barbara Garrick would be reprising their roles, and that Elliot Page would be joining the main cast of the production in a new role.

In October 2018, it was announced that Paul Gross would reprise his role of Brian Hawkins and that Murray Bartlett, Charlie Barnett, Josiah Victoria Garcia, and May Hong had also joined the main cast. Additionally, it was further announced that Jen Richards, Daniela Vega, Michelle Buteau, Ashley Park, Christopher Larkin, Caldwell Tidicue, Matthew Risch, Michael Park, Dickie Hearts, Benjamin Thys, Samantha Soule, Juan Castano, Zosia Mamet, and Victor Garber had been cast in recurring roles. Molly Ringwald later joined the cast in a recurring capacity.

Filming
Principal photography for the series began by July 2018 in New York City. Filming of interior scenes of the series were shot in New York while exterior scenes were set to be filmed in San Francisco, California. On October 5, 2018, the production was shooting in the Nodine Hill section of Yonkers, New York. On October 24, 2018, filming took place at Mission Dolores Park in San Francisco. By January 2019, filming for the series had reportedly concluded.

Critical reception
On Rotten Tomatoes, the series received an approval of 83%, and a 7.50/10 average rating from 42 reviews. The critics' consensus states, "Like a pleasant visit to a place you used to live, Tales of the City provides ample nostalgic comforts and continues the series' mission of celebrating the diversity of San Francisco on its own terms." Metacritic scored it 63 out of 100 based on 15 critics, signifying "generally favorable reviews".

Notes

References

External links

2010s American LGBT-related drama television series
2019 American television series debuts
2019 American television series endings
American LGBT-related web series
English-language Netflix original programming
Tales of the City
Television shows based on American novels
Television series by Universal Television
Television series by Working Title Television
Television shows set in San Francisco
Transgender-related television shows
Gay-related television shows
Polyamory in fiction